Gnaphosa rufula is a ground spider species found in Slovakia, Hungary, Bulgaria, Ukraine, European Russia, and Kazakhstan.

See also 
 List of Gnaphosidae species

References

External links 

Gnaphosidae
Spiders of Europe
Spiders of Russia
Spiders of Western Asia
Spiders of Central Asia
Fauna of Lebanon
Spiders described in 1866